Alfred Charles Knight (5 May 1918 – 19 July 2000) was a British weightlifter. He competed in the men's heavyweight event at the 1948 Summer Olympics.

References

External links
 

1918 births
2000 deaths
British male weightlifters
Olympic weightlifters of Great Britain
Weightlifters at the 1948 Summer Olympics